The 2011 Southern Miss Golden Eagles football team represented the University of Southern Mississippi in the 2011 NCAA Division I FBS football season. The Golden Eagles were led by fourth-year head coach Larry Fedora and played their home games at M. M. Roberts Stadium. They are a member of the East Division of Conference USA. They finished the season 12–2, 7–2 in C-USA play. They were champions of the East Division and defeated undefeated Houston, 49–28, in the C-USA Championship Game to become conference champions. They were invited to the Hawaii Bowl, where they defeated Nevada, 24–17.

Fedora resigned at the end of the regular season to become the head coach at North Carolina. He stayed on and coached the Golden Eagles in the Hawaii Bowl and finished at Southern Miss with a four-year record of 34–19. South Carolina assistant head coach Ellis Johnson took over as head coach in 2012.

Pre-season

Top 25 rankings
During the pre-season, Southern Miss was ranked in several notable top 25 polls. Phil Steele ranked the team as No. 20.  Outside the Top 25, Southern Miss was ranked as No. 55 by Sporting News, No. 31 in the AP Poll, and No. 42 in the Coaches' Poll.

Schedule

Poll rankings

References

Southern Miss
Southern Miss Golden Eagles football seasons
Conference USA football champion seasons
Hawaii Bowl champion seasons
Southern Miss Golden Eagles football